This is a list of members of the South Australian Legislative Council from 1941 to 1944

 Independent MLC Frank Halleday resigned on 14 July 1943 to contest the 1943 federal election in the House of Representatives seat of Barker. A by-election was not held due to the proximity of the 1944 state election.

References
Parliament of South Australia — Statistical Record of the Legislature

Members of South Australian parliaments by term
20th-century Australian politicians